Peče is a village in the Municipality of Moravče in central Slovenia. The area is part of the traditional region of Upper Carniola. It is now included with the rest of the municipality in the Central Slovenia Statistical Region.

Name
Peče was attested in historical sources as Pesche and Peschs in 1238, Pecz in 1332, and Pethschach in 1497, among other spellings.

Church
The parish church in the village is dedicated to Saint Bartholomew and belongs to the Roman Catholic Archdiocese of Ljubljana. It is a Gothic building dating to the 16th century.

Notable people
Notable people that were born or lived in Peče include:
Francis Xavier Pierz (1785–1880), missionary, parish priest in Peče from 1819 to 1829

References

External links

Peče on Geopedia

Populated places in the Municipality of Moravče